Ngwegweni is a village in Umzimvubu Local Municipality in the Eastern Cape province of South Africa, not far from Mount Ayliff.

References

Populated places in the Umzimvubu Local Municipality